Hjördis Lind-Campbell (27 June 1891  – 13 September 1984) was a Swedish physician who was known for her work in sex education and creation of an adoption program for unmarried women.

Early life and education 
Lind-Campbell was born into a Swedish family and had three siblings. She attended the Karolinska Institutet for her undergraduate education in premedical study, and worked for a time at the University of Lund hospital. She met her husband there and married in 1918; they had four children. Lind-Campbell graduated from the University of Lund in 1922 with her M.D.

Career and research 
While practicing medicine throughout the Västerås area, she became a pioneer member of the Medical Women's International Association. She worked in pulmonology, pediatrics, gynecology, and rural medicine. She began a unique adoption program in Sweden, and worked with the National Swedish Association for Sexual Information. Lind-Campbell retired at the age of 82.

References

Further reading
 

Swedish women physicians
20th-century Swedish physicians
Lund University alumni